Fritz Cove is a bay on the northwestern coast of Douglas Island in the City and Borough of Juneau, Alaska, United States.

Historically, Fritz Cove was used for fishing by Alaska Natives, especially the Auke people.  A summer camp named Aangoox̱a Yé was located at the mouth of Fish Creek.  Scottish-American naturalist John Muir camped at the bay on November 10, 1879.

History

The area was surveyed by the USS Jamestown in 1880;  Lieutenant F. M. Symonds named the bay after his son.  The name was first published by the U.S. Coast and Geodetic Survey in 1881.

Geography

Fritz Cove and Gastineau Channel became linked in 1960 through a United States Army Corps of Engineers effort to dredge a navigation route.

Streams flowing into Fritz Cove include Cove Creek, Elevenmile Creek, and Fish Creek. Islands in the bay include Spuhn Island.

Dungeness crabs, Tanner crabs, and king salmon live in the cove; molting of the male Tanner crabs in the cove has been documented since the 1970s.  Scoters, grebes, mergansers, and marbled murrelets can also be seen in the area.

References

Further reading
 James, Bushrod Washington. Alaska: Its Neglected Past, Its Brilliant Future. The Sunshine Publishing Company: Philadelphia, 1897.
 Miller, Mike. Alaska's Southeast: Touring the Inside Passage. Morris Book Publishing. Eleventh edition, 2008.

Bays of Alaska
Bodies of water of Juneau, Alaska